Chiozoon is a cheirurid phacopid trilobite that existed during the lower Silurian of what is now northeastern Greenland. It was described by Philip D. Lane in 1972, and the type species is Chiozoon cowiei.

References

External links
 Chiozoon at the Paleobiology Database

Silurian trilobites of North America
Fossil taxa described in 1972
Extinct animals of Canada
Paleozoic life of Ontario
Cheiruridae
Phacopida genera